The Seventh Day Adventist Reform Movement is a Protestant Christian denomination in the Sabbatarian Adventist movement that formed from a schism in the European Seventh-day Adventist Church during World War I over the position its European church leaders took on Sabbath observance and on committing Adventists to the bearing of arms in military service for Imperial Germany in World War I.

The movement was formerly organised on an international level in 1925 at Gotha, Germany and adopted the name "Seventh Day Adventist Reform Movement".  It was first registered as a General Conference association in 1929 in Burgwedel, near Hanover, Germany. Following the General Conference association's dissolution by the Gestapo in 1936 it was re-registered in Sacramento, California, United States in 1949.  Its present world headquarters are in Roanoke, Virginia, USA.

The Seventh Day Adventist Reform Movement is governed by a General Conference, a worldwide association of constituent territorial Units consisting of Union Conferences, State/Field Conferences, Mission Fields and Missions not attached to any other unit. Through its local church congregations and groups of adherents, affiliated publishing houses, schools, health clinics and hospitals, the Seventh Day Adventist Reform Movement is active in over 132 countries of the world.

The movement's beliefs largely reflect its distinctive Seventh-day Adventist Church heritage and foundational pillars, with some small divergences. See on "Beliefs" below.

History

1914-1918 Seventh-day Adventist Church Schism (Europe) 
The Seventh Day Adventist Reform Movement came about as a result of the actions of L. R. Conradi and certain European church leaders during the war, who decided that it was acceptable for Adventists to take part in war, which was in clear opposition to the historical position of the church that had always upheld the non-combative position. Since the American Civil War, Adventists were known as non-combatants, and had done work in hospitals or given medical care rather than combat roles. The Seventh-day Adventist leaders in Europe when the war began, determined on their own that it was permissible for Adventists to bear arms and serve in the military and other changes which went against traditional Adventist beliefs.

The General Conference of Seventh-day Adventists sent Seventh-day Adventist minister and General Conference Secretary William Ambrose Spicer to investigate the changes these leaders had instituted, but was unable to undo what L. R. Conradi and the others had done during the war.  After the war, the Seventh-day Adventist church sent a delegation of four brethren from the General Conference (Arthur G. Daniells who was president of General Conference of Seventh-day Adventists, L. H. Christian, F. M. Wilcox, M. E. Kern) in July 1920, who came to a Ministerial Meeting in Friedensau with the hope of a reconciliation. Before the 200 Pastors and the Brethren from the General Conference present at this meeting, its European church leaders,  G. Dail, L. R. Conradi, H. F. Schuberth, and P. Drinhaus withdrew their statement about military service and apologized for what they had done. The Reformers were informed of this and the next day saw a meeting by the Adventist brethren with the Reform-Adventists. A. G. Daniells urged them to return to the Seventh-day Adventist church, but the Reform-Adventists maintained that the European church leaders had forsaken the truth during the war and the reconciliation failed. Soon after they began to form a separate group from the official Adventist church. A related group which also came about for the same reasons was the True and Free Seventh-day Adventists (TFSDA) which formed in the Soviet Union at this time, whose most well known leader was Vladimir Shelkov.

The 1951 Schism - SDARM General Conference Session Zeist, Netherlands and its Aftermath 

A major division then took place within the Seventh Day Adventist Reform Movement itself at its General Conference session held at Zeist, Utrecht (province), Netherlands in 1951. The cause for the division involved tensions that had arisen over unresolved issues of the preceding years.  Charges of arbitrariness and authoritarianism by the Seventh Day Adventist Reform Movement leader and on the part of the General Conference administration towards member Units, failures by the General Conference committee to adequately resolve moral failings among leaders, issues concerning mal-administration of Church finances, and procedural and organisational irregularities prior to and during the Session itself are cited by the present organisation as significant contributing factors.

After two weeks of deliberations within the Session trying to resolve some of these tensions, a move was made by a number of delegates to read a declaration enumerating the main problems involved and requesting that a committee to address the entire situation be established. The motion carried on the first vote but was overturned by the chairman. To signify their protest at what was held to be an arbitrary decision of the chair, 45% of delegates present, led by the then Secretary of the General Conference, left the Session room. The Session's proceedings faltered at this point. Efforts to reconcile the situation while all delegates were still present in Netherlands failed.

Another factor affecting the administration of the Session at the time was the international situation behind the iron curtain. Many of the units attached to the General Conference were unable to send delegates to the Zeist session due to restrictions on religious bodies in communist lands.  Proxy letters from a number of Union Conferences were held by the General Conference Secretary enabling the session to convene legally (a provision enabled in the 1949 corporate registration), though the proxy holder still only had one vote regardless of the number of proxies held.  Those Units not represented directly accounted for approximately 60% of the organization's membership.  Consequently, neither of the two factions that became evident at the Zeist session were in a position to make any unilateral decisions.

Over the course of the next year, steps were taken by both parties to explain the situation to their respective member bodies (Union Conferences) that were affiliated up until this time to the one worldwide church administration.  Both factions re-organised themselves as General Conference committees independently of each other and proceeded to take the oversight of the SDARM General Conference affairs.

SDARM General Conference Headquarters in Roanoke, Virginia, USA 
The Seventh Day Adventist Reform Movement had been first registered as a general conference association in Burgwedel, near Hanover, Germany in 1929. Though never approved by the inaugural 1925 Gotha SDARM General Conference Session, the designation "International Missionary Society" was added to the beginning of the name. The full registered name at that time took the form "International Missionary Society, Seventh-day Adventist Reform Movement, General Conference". The reasons for adding the designation to the beginning of the name were purely pragmatic, and done in the interests of securing General Conference finances on loan to one of its member Units, namely the German Union Conference.  The SDARM General Conference operated under this German registration until 1936 when the association was dissolved by the Gestapo.

From 1936 until the conclusion of the second World War, there was no legally registered SDARM General Conference entity anywhere in the world, and would not be until 1949.  The international situation during those years prevented the convening of a General Conference Session.  It was not until 1948, when the first post-war General Conference session was held, that the delegates agreed to re-register the worldwide interests of the Seventh Day Adventist Reform Movement by incorporating the SDARM General Conference as an association in the USA. They also agreed to do this "under the name that was adopted by the General Conference delegation in session in 1925".  This decision was carried out in 1949.  The registered name was now correctly, "Seventh Day Adventist Reform Movement General Conference." It was under the By-Laws of this newly incorporated body that the 1951 Zeist General Conference Session was convened.

By 1951 the SDARM General Conference affairs and financial interests were formally associated with the USA registered entity. Consequently, in the aftermath of the Zeist session, legal proceedings to establish the recognized administrators of the registered General Conference corporate entity commenced.  These proceedings were finalised in May 1952 in an out-of-court agreement between the two factions.  Representatives of the faction that had engaged in the protest walk-out in 1951 were left in control of the registered SDARM General Conference association.

By 1955, when the next Session of Seventh Day Adventist Reform Movement General Conference convened under the auspices the USA registered association, delegates present represented "9000 members (1000 less than in 1951)". This was a representation of 90% of the worldwide church membership recorded prior to the 1951 division.

International Missionary Society (IMS)
Following the 1952 legal proceedings, in June of that year, representatives of the faction that had been the subject of the protest at Zeist conducted a second re-organisation. To distinguish themselves from their opposing faction, they adopted the name "International Missionary Society, Seventh-day Adventist Reform Movement, General Conference" with headquarters in Mosbach, Baden in Germany.  As mentioned previously, the Seventh Day Adventist Reform Movement, as a general conference association, had been registered under this name in Germany in 1929 and operated under that name until 1936 when the association was dissolved by the Gestapo.  "International Missionary Society" was a name that had been associated with the German Union Conference of the Seventh-Day Adventist Reform Movement from its inception in 1919?. As the inaugural 1925 SDARM General Conference session did not agree to use this designation in its official name, the 1949 registered entity did not use it.  With the opposing faction now adopting this designation and adding it to the 1925 agreed name, the designation "International Missionary Society" thereafter became associated exclusively with those affiliated with the interests of that faction.

Post 1952 Re-Unification Attempts - IMS and SDARM General Conference 
With both factions formally organized, affiliations of Union and Field Conferences associated under one or the other of the two corporate administrations.  Though they remained separate both in administration and worship, the theological beliefs espoused by each entity's adherents were common to both. Despite this common platform of belief, tensions from the 1951 schism continued to remain high. Consequently, official efforts in 1967 and again in 1993 to reconcile both administrations at a General Conference level were unsuccessful.

Post War World II relations with Seventh-day Adventist Church
In 2005, the mainstream Seventh-day Adventist church tried to make amends and apologized for its failures during World War II, as the issue from the actions of L. R. Conradi continued during that war also. Some members see it as the first attempts to reconcile the Seventh Day Adventist Reform Movement with the mainstream Seventh-day Adventist church. However, the actions of the SDA Church towards those who took a conscientious stand against all military service during World War I, were not acknowledged in the apology. The position of the SDA Church towards those engaged in military service, particularly combatants, remains an unresolved issue today.

Name of Church Congregations 
While local church congregations use the name Seventh Day Adventist Reform Movement, those affiliated with the International Missionary Society General Conference also combine the designation "International Missionary Society" into their name to distinguish themselves from SDARM General Conference Units.

Beliefs 

The Seventh Day Adventist Reform Movement (SDARM General Conference) identifies itself with a conservative Seventh-day Adventist theological and eschatological heritage. While it holds to the basic tenets of the Seventh-day Adventist faith, commonly referred to as the pillars or landmarks of the faith for these landmark teachings, there is a divergence in degree on some post-1914 doctrinal positions taken by L. R. Conradi and some of the European church leaders of the Seventh-day Adventist Church in both interpretation and application.

The Seventh Day Adventist Reform Movement's official position as conscientious objectors in relation to war and military service reflects the pacifist position of the Seventh-day Adventist Church during the 1861-1865 American Civil War. This is in direct response to what L. R. Conradi and others presented to the members and distinct from the official Seventh-day Adventist Church position which is one of non-combatancy, though in practice Seventh-day Adventist members have served in combatant roles in the military services.

Other divergences include the Seventh Day Adventist Reform Movement's positions on divorce and remarriage, closed communion, the sealing work of Revelation 7 (the SDARM holding to a pre-1914 view of its literal and number-limited nature), and the remnant church of Revelation 12:17.

The Seventh Day Adventist Reform Movement, as does the official Seventh-day Adventist Church, maintains the belief that Ellen G. White, a co-founder of the Seventh-day Adventist Church, manifested the New Testament "Gift of Prophecy". Though she had died before the formation of the SDA Reform Movement, her inspired writings, commonly referred to as testimonies, are held in the highest regard by the movement as a whole. Consistent with the Seventh-day Adventist Church, the SDA Reform Movement believes her inspired works do not take the place of the Bible. Rather they are considered a help to the believing church in bringing men and women back to the neglected truths of the Bible, with an emphasis on the need for professed believers to be faithful in the practice of its principles. 
 
Whereas the Seventh-day Adventist church emphasises the message of the three angels of Revelation 14:6-12, the Reform Movement places a distinct emphasis on a fourth angelic message based on Revelation 18:1-4.  The movement claims that the message of this other angel was first given at 1888 Minneapolis General Conference of the Seventh-day Adventist Church. This claim is maintained by the Seventh Day Adventist Reform Movement as the unique purpose for its existence as a distinct organisation separate to the Seventh-day Adventist Church. The message is captured in the expression "Christ our Righteousness", the foundation for "Justification by Faith".

Aside from the divergences, an examination of the SDA Reform Movement's published beliefs, indicate many similarities in theology with the traditional Seventh-day Adventist beliefs and also the more conservative Historic Adventism and Last Generation Theology wings of the Seventh-day Adventist Church.

A list of beliefs, along with an expanded explanation, may be viewed online.

Officers

General Conference Sessions

See also

SDARM General Conference
International Missionary Society 
SDARM Units
Seventh-day Adventist Church
History of the Seventh-day Adventist Church
List of religions and religious denominations#Adventist and related churches
List of Christian denominations#Millerites and comparable groups
Seventh-day Adventist interfaith relations – for relations with other Protestants and Catholics
 Sabbath in Seventh-day Adventism
 Seventh-day Adventist eschatology
 Seventh-day Adventist theology
 Seventh-day Adventist worship
 Ellen G. White
 Teachings of Ellen White#End times
 Inspiration of Ellen White
 Prophecy in the Seventh-day Adventist Church

References

Sources
The Seventh-day Adventist Encyclopedia, Review & Herald Publishing Association
History of the Seventh Day Adventist Reform Movement, Alfons Balbach, Reformation Herald Publishing Association, 1999.

External links
International Missionary Society Seventh-day Adventist Church Reform Movement General Conference

SDARM sites
SDARM
SDARM General Conference
Colombian Union - Spanish language
[GC Medical Department]
White Creek Wellness Center (Tennessee, USA)
 Mission Projects International – USA
SDA Reform Movement in Japan – JAPAN

Sites criticizing
Biblical Research Institute of the SDA Church
Sevy Taliban

 
History of the Seventh-day Adventist Church
Christian terminology
Premillennialism
Trinitarianism